Fear No Evil is the second studio album by English heavy metal band Grim Reaper, released in 1985 under the British independent label Ebony Records.

Track listing
All tracks by Nick Bowcott and Steve Grimmett.

The intro to "Final Scream" was redone on the Dying Fetus EP Grotesque Impalement, where Michael's name was changed to Davey.

Personnel
Grim Reaper
Steve Grimmett – vocals
Nick Bowcott – guitar
Dave Wanklin – bass
Mark Simon – drums

Production
Darryl Johnston – producer, engineer
Nick Bowcott – arrangements
Howie Weinberg – mastering
Walter O'Brien, Bob Chiappardi – worldwide representation for Concret Management
Kim Seabourne – artwork, sleeve concept

Charts

References

1985 albums
Grim Reaper (band) albums
RCA Records albums